The Intruder is a 1953 British drama film directed by Guy Hamilton and starring Jack Hawkins, George Cole, Dennis Price and Michael Medwin. The film is based on the 1949 novel by Robin Maugham called The Line on Ginger.

Post-war London is the backdrop including Belgravia, Covent Garden market, Loughborough Junction and Dulwich Hospital.

A contemporary critic commented that the film treated the subject "with intelligence, taste, and a feeling for the medium"; he also wrote "Medwin... gives a brilliant study of a good fellow gone wrong".

Plot
Ex-Colonel, now stockbroker, Wolf Merton (Hawkins) returns home one evening to find it being burgled by an armed intruder. Merton recognises the culprit, Ginger Edwards (Medwin), as a former soldier who had fought courageously under his command in a tank regiment during the Second World War. Merton briefly questions Edwards on how he got into a life of crime, but, suspecting Merton has called the police, the burglar makes his escape. Merton sets out to discover why one of his best men became involved in crime after he was de-mobbed. The story unfolds in a sequence of flash-back episodes of events during the war and how they affected, or contrasted with, how each of the main characters fared when they returned to civilian life.

Cast

 Jack Hawkins as Wolf Merton
 George Cole as John Summers
 Dennis Price as Leonard Pirry
 Michael Medwin as Ginger Edwards 
 Duncan Lamont as Donald Cope
 Arthur Howard as Bertram Slake
 Nicholas Phipps as Captain Fetherstonhaugh
 Dora Bryan as Dora Bee 
 Edward Chapman as Walter Lowden 
 Susan Shaw as Tina 
 Harold Lang as Bill 
 George Baker as Adjutant 
 Patrick Barr as Inspector Williams 
 Michael Ripper as Mechanic 
 Marc Sheldon as Astley
 Campbell Singer as War Office Records Sergeant 
 Peter Martyn as Sentry
 Robert A'Dair as Luigi 
 Richard Wattis as School Master 
 Gene Anderson as June Maple
 David Horne as General 
 Charles Lamb as Glazier (uncredited)
 Leonard Sharp as Glazier (uncredited)

Soundtrack
The soundtrack was composed by Francis Chagrin, conducted by Muir Mathieson. He later adapted the music for concert use as the Four Orchestral Episodes.

Video Release
In 2020 Network Distributing Limited produced and released the film on Blu-ray.

References

External links
 The Intruder at Internet Movie Database

1953 films
1953 crime drama films
Films directed by Guy Hamilton
Films set in Italy
Films set in England
Films set in London
British crime drama films
British black-and-white films
1950s English-language films
1950s British films